Autostrada A2, otherwise known as the Autostrada del Mediterraneo ("Mediterranean Motorway") or Salerno–Reggio Calabria, is a 432-km-long, Italian motorway in the south of Italy. Running between the towns of Fisciano, in the Province of Salerno, and Villa San Giovanni, in the Province of Reggio Calabria, the motorway forms part of European roads E45 and E841.

History 

The A2 was created in 2017 by merging the Fisciano to Salerno section of the spur route RA 2 (part of European route E841) with the Salerno to Villa San Giovanni section of the A3 motorway (part of E45).

Route 
The motorway starts in Fisciano, in Campania, where there is a junction between the RA2 and the A30 motorway.

The provincial capital cities served by the A2 motorway are:

 Salerno;
 Potenza, which is accessible from Sicignano junction through RA5;
 Cosenza;
 Catanzaro, which is accessible from Lamezia Terme junction through SS280;
 Vibo Valentia;
 Reggio Calabria.

Spur routes 
The A2 has two spurs; both of them were until 2017 part of the A3 motorway:
 A2 diramazione Napoli (2.335 km) connects the A2 at the Salerno-Fratte junction with the present A3 at the Salerno centro junction and is part of European route E45;
 A2 diramazione Reggio Calabria (9.048 km) is a prolongation of the A2 from its southern terminus at Villa San Giovanni to the city of Reggio Calabria and is part of European route E90. It is part of EUR 3 from Villa San Giovani to Fisciano.

Major Cities 

A2 goes through many cities, including Cosenza, Battipaglia, and Salerno. In Salerno, it passes by the Cemetery of Loculi S. Andrea.

See also 
 Autostrade of Italy

External links 

 ANAS SpA 
 Autostrada del Mediterraneo (official site) 

A02
Transport in Basilicata
Transport in Calabria
Transport in Campania